Gilberto Martínez (born 1979) is a Costa Rican footballer.

Gilberto Martínez may also refer to:

 Gilberto Martínez (sport shooter) (1897–1974), Mexican sports shooter
 Gilberto Martínez (swimmer) (born 1934), Colombian swimmer
 Gilberto Érick Martínez (born 1985), Mexican footballer
 Gilberto Martínez Solares (1906–1997), Mexican actor, cinematographer, director and screenwriter